The North Korea national handball team is the national handball team of North Korea.

Asian Championship record
1991 – 9th place

References

External links
IHF profile

Men's national handball teams
National sports teams of North Korea
Handball in North Korea